The George H.W. Bush Presidential Library and Museum is the presidential library and burial site of George H. W. Bush, the 41st president of the United States (1989–1993), and his wife Barbara Bush. Located on a  site on the west campus of Texas A&M University at 1000 George Bush Drive West in College Station, Texas, the library is one of 13 administered by the National Archives and Records Administration (NARA).

Description

The George H.W. Bush Presidential Library was dedicated on November 6, 1997, as the George Bush Presidential Library and Museum, opening to the public shortly thereafter, and designed by the architectural firm of Hellmuth, Obata + Kassabaum.

Situated on a plaza adjoining the Annenberg Presidential Conference Center and the George Bush School of Government and Public Service, the library is administered by NARA under the provisions of the Presidential Libraries Act of 1955.

The mission of the George H.W. Bush Presidential Library is to preserve and make available for research the official records, personal papers, and artifacts of President George H.W. Bush, to support democracy, promote civic education, and increase historical understanding of U.S. national experience through the life and times of George H.W. Bush.

The textual archives contain more than 44 million pages of personal papers and official documents subject to the Presidential Records Act, as well as personal records from associates connected with President Bush's public career as Congressman, Ambassador to the United Nations, Chief of the U.S. Liaison Office in China, Chairman of the Republican National Committee, and Director of the Central Intelligence Agency. As in all NARA presidential libraries, records are housed in acid-free storage (Hollinger) boxes in a balanced humidity and temperature atmosphere. The archival storage area houses  of records, and the library has a National Security vault holding  of Presidential Records. In addition to memoranda, speeches, and reports found in the textual collection, there is an extensive audio-visual and photographic archive.

Permanent exhibits draw on the best of the museum collection to visually convey the essence of George Bush's life and public service career and to illustrate historical events of this period in American history. Changing exhibits explore topics on the Bush Administration, American history, American presidents, and other related topics.

Its classroom is the first of its kind in the Presidential Libraries network. The classroom can be used by student groups as a computer learning lab or as a traditional classroom. It is the Bush Library and Museum's educational mission to inform and enrich learning for all ages about American history, the role of the presidency in general with special focus on the administration of George Bush.

In 2011, the George Bush Presidential Library Foundation was given an overall score of 2 out of 4 by Charity Navigator. The CEO was listed on that site's "10 Highly Paid CEOs at Low-Rated Charities".

Renovations and expansion
On April 23, 2007, the permanent exhibit closed for complete renovation (though the temporary exhibit gallery remained open, hosting the popular "Traveling White House in Miniature" exhibit). The museum reopened November 10, 2007, with a ceremony during which the former president arrived via parachute jump.  The permanent exhibit now features (like many other presidential libraries), a replica of the Oval Office; unlike those other presidential libraries, visitors are able to fully enter the replica, sit behind the president's desk, and have a souvenir photo taken.

On November 8, 2019, the Union Pacific Railroad donated its EMD SD70ACe locomotive #4141 to the library, where it will be on permanent display in the pavilion. The exhibit was expected to open in 2020 but is now expected to open in 2024. It will be placed between the library and the Annenberg Presidential Conference Center. Unveiled on October 18, 2005 in honor of Bush, it remained in active service until 2009, and later was brought back to participate in Bush's funeral train on December 6, 2018. It subsequently remained in active service following the funeral until its last run between November 8 and November 9, as part of the Union Pacific 4014 Southwest Tour, in which the plans for the display were unveiled. 4141 returned to the presidential library on March 12, 2021.

In addition to UP 4141, the Bush Foundation is also seeking to have a retired Boeing VC-25A and a Sikorsky UH-60 Black Hawk displayed on the library grounds, of which the UH-60 Black Hawk has been confirmed for permanent display.

On December 2, 2019, a life-size bronze statue of Sully, the President's service dog during his final six months, was unveiled at the site.

George Bush Award
The Presidential Library Foundation also awards the George Bush Award for Excellence in Public Service, which "recognizes an individual's or group's dedication to public service at the local, state, national or international levels".  The recipients are given a crystal sculpture designed by Eric Hilton, comprising a "three panel prismatic column of crystal. In the center of the column is a shallow lens engraving of the world." The winners are:

 2019 John Major
2018 Brian Mulroney
 2016 Bob Dole
 2013 Sheikha Moza bint Nasser
 2011 Ronald Reagan
 2007 Robert M. Gates
 2006 William "Billy" F. Graham
 2004 Arnold Schwarzenegger
 2003 Edward M. Kennedy
 2001 Mikhail Gorbachev
 2000 Helmut Kohl

Burials

Bush's daughter Pauline Robinson Bush (1949–1953) was originally buried at Putnam Cemetery in Greenwich, Connecticut, but was re-buried at the library in 2000.

Barbara Bush was buried on April 21, 2018, following her death on April 17, 2018.

George H. W. Bush was buried on December 6, 2018, following his death on November 30, 2018.

See also
 Presidential Records Act
 MSC Student Conference on National Affairs
 George W. Bush Presidential Center
 Presidential memorials in the United States

References

External links

 George H.W. Bush Presidential Library and Museum
 George H.W. Bush Presidential Library Foundation
"Life Portrait of George H. W. Bush", from C-SPAN's American Presidents: Life Portraits, broadcast from the George H.W. Bush Presidential Library and Museum, December 13, 1999

Library buildings completed in 1997
George H. W. Bush
Libraries in College Station, Texas
Museums in Brazos County, Texas
Bush, George H. W.
Texas A&M University
History museums in Texas
Presidential museums in Texas
1997 establishments in Texas
Tombs of presidents of the United States
Memorials to George H. W. Bush